The 1976 United States Senate election in California took place on November 2, 1976. Incumbent Democratic U.S. Senator John V. Tunney ran for re-election to a second term, but was defeated by Republican S. I. Hayakawa. As of 2023, this is the last time an incumbent Democratic Senator from California lost re-election.

Democratic primary

Candidates
Lois T. Bodle
Leslie W. "Les" Craven, nominee for U.S. Representative in California's 25th congressional district in 1970 and 1972
Howard L. Gifford, candidate for U.S. Senate in 1974
Tom Hayden, anti-war activist and husband of Jane Fonda
Millard F. Slover
Frank L. Thomas
John V. Tunney, incumbent U.S Senator
Bob Wallach
Ronald L. Williams

Results

Republican primary

Candidates
Alphonzo E. Bell Jr., U.S. Representative from Santa Monica
Hannibal C. Burchette V
Robert H. Finch, former Lieutenant Governor of California, United States Secretary of Health, Education, and Welfare, and advisor to President Richard Nixon
John L. Harmer, former Lieutenant Governor and State Senator
S. I. Hayakawa, professor of semantics and president emeritus of San Francisco State University
Henry Hill
Michael A. Hirt
Walter Hollywood
Clyde F. Tracy
James A. Ware, perennial candidate

Results

General election

Results

See also 
 1976 United States Senate elections

References

California
1976
1976 California elections